Chaim Samuel Hönig (1 February 1926 – 19 March 2018) was a Brazilian mathematician. He was the main proposer of the Brazilian Mathematical Colloquium (1957), one of the founders of the Brazilian Mathematical Society (SBM), and its first president. Hönig was a full professor at the Institute of Mathematics and Statistics of the University of São Paulo and a member of the Brazilian Academy of Sciences. Hönig made relevant contributions to functional analysis.

Books 
, Volumes 1–2, Instituto de Matemática e Estatística da Universidade de São Paulo, 1970
Volterra–Stieltjes integral Equations: Functional Analytic Methods, Linear Constraints (Mathematics Studies), Elsevier, 1975

References 

1926 births
2018 deaths
University of São Paulo alumni
Textbook writers
Members of the Brazilian Academy of Sciences
20th-century Brazilian mathematicians
German emigrants to Brazil
Scientists from Berlin